Mel Long (born November 22, 1946) is a former American football linebacker. He played college football at Toledo and high school football for Macomber. In 1998, he was inducted into the College Football Hall of Fame. The 6-1, 230-pound Long  played defensive tackle and was a two-time All-America, a First-team in 1970 and a consensus selection in 1971. Long was selected in the 11th round (278th selection) of the 1972 NFL Draft by the Cleveland Browns and played for three seasons.

After receiving his military draft notice, Long enlisted in the Marines and trained as a rifleman. He served in Vietnam from September 23, 1966 to October 18, 1967 where he received the Bronze Star and Navy Cross (after the Medal of Honor, the Navy Cross is the highest Marine/Navy decoration for valor).  He participated in Operation Tuscaloosa (January 26, 1967) and Operations Union and Union II (April to June, 1967). During the Battle of Vin Huey, an eight-hour battle in which 70% of U.S. troops were wounded or killed, Long continued to fight for hours after being wounded. Long is the most highly decorated veteran to play professional football.

After leaving the military, Long enrolled at the University of Toledo. Toledo led the nation in defensive statistics all three years. Toledo won the conference all three years and won the Tangerine Bowl all three seasons as well. The 1969 team went 11-0 and beat Davidson 56-35 in the Tangerine Bowl. The following season, their record was 12-0 with a 40-12 victory over William & Mary in the 1970 Tangerine Bowl. And in 1971, it was 12-0 (giving Toledo a 35-0 record for 3 years) and victory over Richmond (28-3) in the Tangerine Bowl.

References

1946 births
Living people
All-American college football players
American football defensive tackles
Cleveland Browns players
College Football Hall of Fame inductees
Sportspeople from Toledo, Ohio
Toledo Rockets football players
Players of American football from Ohio